Cryptothecia methylmicrophyllinica is a species of corticolous (bark-dwelling) lichen in the family Arthoniaceae. Found in Java, it was formally described as a new species in 2007 by André Aptroot and Jos Leo Spier. The type specimen was collected by Pieter Groenhart in 1954 from West Bantam. The lichen makes a thin, dull, greyish-white thallus. It contains the secondary compound 5-O-microphyllinic acid, which is detectable using thin-layer chromatography; the specific epithet refers to the presence of this substance.

References

methylmicrophyllinica
Lichen species
Lichens described in 2010
Lichens of Asia
Taxa named by André Aptroot